18th Division or 18th Infantry Division may refer to:

Infantry divisions
 18th Infantry Division (France)
 18th Infantry Division (Wehrmacht), Germany
 18th Division (German Empire)
 18th Reserve Division (German Empire)
 18th Infantry Division (Greece)
 18th Division (Imperial Japanese Army)
 18th Indian Division, a British Indian Army unit during World War I
 18th Division (North Korea)
 18th Infantry Division (Poland)
 18th Division (South Vietnam)
 18th Guards Motor Rifle Division, Russia
 18th Rifle Division (Soviet Union)
 18th (Eastern) Division, a United Kingdom division in World War I
 18th Infantry Division (United Kingdom), a World War II division
 39th Infantry Division (United States), briefly designated the 18th Division during 1917
 18th Infantry Division Messina, an Italian unit in World War II

Cavalry divisions
 18th Cavalry Division (Soviet Union)

Armoured divisions
 18th Panzer Division (Wehrmacht), Germany
 18th Tank Division (Soviet Union), part of the 7th Mechanized Corps in World War II

Artillery divisions
18th Artillery Division (Wehrmacht), Germany
18th Machine Gun Artillery Division, Soviet Union and Russia
18th Artillery Division (Soviet Union), part of the 42nd Army in World War II

Aviation divisions
 18th Strategic Aerospace Division, United States